Zdzisław Smoliński (7 December 1942 – 4 April 1993) was a Polish athlete. He competed in the men's hammer throw at the 1964 Summer Olympics.

References

1942 births
1993 deaths
Athletes (track and field) at the 1964 Summer Olympics
Polish male hammer throwers
Olympic athletes of Poland
Athletes from Warsaw